Hugh Wyndham may refer to:

 Sir Hugh Wyndham (1602–1684), English Judge of the Common Pleas and Baron of the Exchequer
Hugh Wyndham (Minehead MP) (c. 1624–71), MP for Minehead 1661–71
 Sir Hugh Wyndham (diplomat) (1836–1916), British diplomat, minister to Serbia, Brazil and Romania
 Hugh Wyndham, 4th Baron Leconfield (1877–1963), British peer, politician and author